Hamish Shaw (13 September 1896 - 10 November 1990) was a  Scotland international rugby union player. He became the 63rd President of the Scottish Rugby Union.

Rugby Union career

Amateur career

He played for Edinburgh Academicals.

Provincial career

He played for Edinburgh District in the 1920 inter-city match.

International career

He received two caps for Scotland both in 1921.

Administrative career

He was President of the Scottish Rugby Union for the period 1949 to 1950.

References

1896 births
1990 deaths
Scottish rugby union players
Presidents of the Scottish Rugby Union
Edinburgh District (rugby union) players
Scotland international rugby union players
Edinburgh Academicals rugby union players
Rugby union players from Edinburgh
Rugby union number eights